Warrah River is one of the two largest watercourses on West Falkland. It is named after the Falkland Islands wolf (Dusicyon australis, formerly Canis antarcticus) or "warrah". The last warrah was shot on this island in 1876.

It starts in Muffler Jack Mountain and runs for twenty miles to the sea. It is fairly popular for fishing. It has one main tributary, Green Hills/Green Hill Stream.

References

Rivers of West Falkland